This is a list of flags used in Myanmar (also known as Burma).

State/Union Flag

Flags of administrative divisions

States

Regions

Union territory

Self-administered zones and divisions

Self-administered zones

Self-administered divisions

Military flags

Commander-in-Chief

Army

Regional Military Commands

Common flags

Battalions

Divisions

Navy

Air Force

Law enforcement flag

Ministry flags

Religious flags

Historical flags

National

Governmental

Embassy

Civil

Military

Commander-in-Chief

Army

Navy

Air Force

Administrative Divisions

States

Divisions / Regions

Former national flag proposals

Political flags

Armed groups

See also

References 

Burmese states
States and regions
Flags
 
National symbols of Myanmar